Lolinato G. To-ong  was a Philippine Marine Corps officer and a posthumous recipient of the Philippines' highest military award for courage, the Medal of Valor. Then-First Lieutenant To-ong served with the 52nd Marine Company of the Force Reconnaissance Battalion during the 2000 Philippine campaign against the Moro Islamic Liberation Front. In a military operation in Matanog, Maguindanao, To-ong and enlisted Marine Domingo Deluana were themselves wounded while providing suppressive fire to cover the medical evacuation of wounded fellow Marines. Despite their wounds, they continued maneuvering and providing cover fire until an RPG blast caught the pair.  To-ong and Deluana were killed in action.

Captain To-ong is buried in Section 1A at the Libingan ng mga Bayani in Taguig, Metro Manila.

The Philippine Navy coastal fast assault interdiction craft BRP Lolinato To-ong (PG 902) is named after To-ong.

References

Armed Forces of the Philippines Medal of Valor
Recipients of the Philippine Medal of Valor
Philippine Marine Corps personnel
2000 deaths